The Serbian Renewal Movement (SPO) is a liberal and monarchist political party in Serbia.

History 
The Serbian Renewal Movement party was founded in 1990 through the merger of Drašković's faction from the Serbian National Renewal (SNO) party and Vojislav Šešelj's Serbian Freedom Movement. Šešelj left the party in 1991 after internal quarrels and founded the Serbian Radical Party. It was initially aligned with national conservatism and supported the territorial expansion of Serbia.

The Democratic Movement of Serbia was formed in May 1992 as a political alliance made up primarily of SPO, New Democracy (ND), Democratic Party of Serbia (DSS). The political alliance however broke, and was dissolved in 1993. The SPO was part of the "Together" (Zajedno) coalition in the 1996 parliamentary election which received 23.8% of the popular vote, losing to the Socialist Party of Serbia (SPS). In 1997, Drašković ran twice for president but finished third in both elections. Its party won the third largest number of seats in that year's Serbian parliamentary elections. A dissident group inside the party abandoned the SPO and formed New Serbia (NS) in 1997.

In early 1999, the SPO joined the Slobodan Milošević-led government, and Drašković became a Yugoslav Deputy Prime Minister. The SPO had a place in Serbia's Rambouillet Agreement delegation and held posts such as the Yugoslav Information Ministry to show a more pro-Western face to the world in the run-up to NATO's bombing campaign in 1999 against the country. In the midst of the war, Drašković and the SPO pulled out of the government, calling on Milošević to surrender to NATO.

The SPO participated in an attempt to overthrow Milošević in 1999, which faltered after Drašković broke off his alliance with opposition leader Zoran Đinđić. This caused the anti-Milošević elements to suggest that he was working for Milošević.

In 2000 presidential and parliamentary elections in the Federal Republic of Yugoslavia in which Milošević lost, the Serbian Renewal Movement overestimated its strength and ran independently, outside of the vast Democratic Opposition of Serbia coalition. Vojislav Mihajlović, grandson of Chetnik commander Draža Mihajlović, was its presidential candidate. He was opposed by Vojislav Koštunica of DOS, Slobodan Milošević of the ruling SPS and Tomislav Nikolić of the Serbian Radical Party. The SPO's vote collapsed, with its traditional voters drawn by Kostunica's conservatism and by the fact that he was their best hope to remove Milošević from power.

There was talk before the 5. October changes of dissolving the Mirko Marjanović government in Serbia and setting up a government with the Serbian Radical Party. Following the 5.October changes the SPO participated in a so-called national unity government that served effectively under DOS "coordinator" Zoran Đinđić. In December 2000, after two months of DOS rule, Serbian parliamentary elections were held. The SPO, once the strongest opposition, failed to enter the parliament.

In 2003, Drašković called for the re-establishment of a parliamentary monarchy in Serbia as the best means for its European integration.

The party fought the December 2003 legislative elections in a coalition with New Serbia. The coalition received 7.7% of the popular vote and 22 seats in parliament. 13 of these were allocated to the SPO. In turn, the coalition had dispatched 8 deputies into the federal Assembly of Serbia and Montenegro.

SPO-NS became part of Vojislav Koštunica's first elected cabinet. Vuk Drašković was selected for Minister of Foreign Affairs.

Following a split in the party, 9 members of parliament joined the newly formed Serbian Democratic Renewal Movement leaving the SPO with only 4. One of the 4 was then bought off by the political tycoon Bogoljub Karić to form his party's list.

The SPO participated in the 2007 election independently and received 3.33% of the vote, winning no seats.

In the 2008 elections the SPO took part in the For a European Serbia coalition under President Boris Tadić, receiving 38.42% of the vote and 102 seats in parliament. Four seats were given to the SPO along with the Ministry of Diaspora portfolio.

Ideology 
During the 1990s, the Serbian Renewal Movement was orientated towards ultranationalism and irredentism, and it supported revisionism and anti-communism. During that period, it was positioned on the right-wing on the political spectrum. It was also characterized as a right-wing populist party, and it was backed by the Serbian Orthodox Church. It also held conservative views.

Although after the 2000s, the party rejected its radical nationalist past and statism, and embraced liberal-democratic elements. It also shifted to liberalism, and economic liberalism, and it adopted a more moderate right, and centre-right position. It was also described as moderate nationalist during that period.

Since its inception, it has been described as monarchist, and it advocates for the restoration of parliamentary monarchy. Since the late 2000s, it has been supportive of accession of Serbia to the European Union and NATO, and in the early 2010s, it shifted its support towards the recognition of Kosovo.

Presidents of the Serbian Renewal Movement (1990–present)

Electoral performance

Parliamentary elections

Presidential elections

References

External links 

Official website

1990 establishments in Serbia
Conservative parties in Serbia
Eastern Orthodox political parties
Monarchist parties in Serbia
Political parties established in 1990
Political parties in Yugoslavia
Pro-European political parties in Serbia
Liberal parties in Serbia
Serb nationalist parties
Serbian irredentism
Centre-right parties in Europe
Right-wing parties in Europe
Right-wing populism in Serbia
Anti-communism in Serbia